Wei Zhonghu (born 23 July 1983) is a former Chinese footballer.

Career statistics

Club

Notes

References

1983 births
Living people
Chinese footballers
Chinese expatriate footballers
Association football defenders
Hong Kong Premier League players
Kitchee SC players
Tai Chung FC players
Chinese expatriate sportspeople in Hong Kong
Expatriate footballers in Hong Kong